Stanmer Park is a large public park immediately to the west of the University of Sussex, and to the north-east of the city of Brighton in the county of East Sussex, England, UK. It is a Local Nature Reserve and English Heritage, under the National Heritage Act 1983, has registered the park on the Register of Parks and Gardens of Special Historic Interest in England at Grade II level. 

The eighteenth century park contains the Grade I listed Stanmer House and also 25 Grade II listed buildings and structures. These form the village of Stanmer and Stanmer Church within the park, which would once have been the estate of the house. All were private until bought by Brighton's Council in 1947. There is a café, Stanmer Tea Rooms, in the village.

A major restoration project is underway funded through the National Lottery, the City Council, Plumpton College and the South Downs National Park Authority. Once completed, this should give improved infrastructure, facilities and accessibility to the park, explain the heritage better and provide a new walled public garden One Garden Brighton. New employment and volunteer opportunities and events are also planned to start in 2021.

Stanmer House was built for the Pelham family in 1722 around an earlier building. A mistress of King George IV later lived there. It was used as the first administrative centre of the 1961 University of Sussex, during the construction of its campus over a part of the park. A walk of elm trees was preserved within the campus design, by architect Sir Basil Spence. The house reopened in June 2006 after extensive restoration but there have been difficulties in bringing it into successful use. 

The church, adjacent to the village pond, was built in 1838 on the site of a 14th-century building. The church is now maintained by the Stanmer Preservation Society, which also runs the Donkey Wheel.

The woods beyond the park to the north and west lead into Wild Park and the open South Downs countryside, part of the South Downs National Park. Immediately to the south of the park runs the major A27 road.

References

Earthship 
The Park also has one of Britain's few Earthships

External links
 Stanmer Park (Brighton and Hove Council website)
 Stanmer House website
 Stanmer Preservation Society
 Stanmer Park Tea Rooms website
 One Garden Brighton website

Brighton and Hove
Parks and open spaces in East Sussex
Local Nature Reserves in East Sussex